Harley Refsal is an internationally recognized figure carver, specializing in Scandinavian flat-plane style of woodcarving.

Background
Refsal was born and raised on a farm near Hoffman, Minnesota, which was homesteaded by his Norwegian-immigrant grandparents. He began working in wood as a young boy. His father, a carpenter and farmer, and a woodworker uncle who lived nearby kept him well supplied with wood, tools, and encouragement.

Career
Refsal lived in Norway in the 1960s and again in the 1980s, and has traveled extensively throughout Scandinavia. Upon retiring from full-time teaching at Luther College, Decorah, Iowa in 2010, he holds the title Professor Emeritus of Scandinavian Folk Art. Since the 1980s, Refsal, who speaks fluent Norwegian, has shared his knowledge of and skills in Scandinavian-style flat-plane figure carving with thousands of carvers through courses and presentations in North America and in Scandinavia.

Refsal is an Emeritus Member of the Caricature Carvers of America. In 1996 he was decorated by H.M. Harald V, King of Norway, receiving the St. Olav's Medal, in recognition of his role in reinvigorating and popularizing Scandinavian figure carving in both North America and Norway. Refsal teaches carving at a variety of course centers through the U.S., including Vesterheim Museum, Decorah, IA; North House Folk School, Grand Marais, MN; Milan Village Arts School, Milan, MN; Norsk Wood Works, Barronett, WI; and the John C. Campbell Folk School, Brasstown, NC.

He was named 2012 Woodcarver of the Year by Woodcarving Illustrated Magazine.

Education
 B.A., Augsburg College, Minneapolis, Minnesota
 Eksamen Filosophicum, University of Oslo
 M. Div., Luther Theological Seminary, St. Paul, Minnesota
 Cand. Mag., Telemark University College, Rauland, Norway

Publications

References

American woodcarvers
Norwegian woodcarvers
American people of Norwegian descent
Augsburg University alumni
University of Oslo alumni
Living people
People from Grant County, Minnesota
Year of birth missing (living people)